Anna Cleaver is a professional triathlete from New Zealand.

Born and raised in Auckland, Cleaver was a top level swimmer, coached by Jan Cameron, in her teenage years. As a result, she is first out of the water in many of the races in which she competes. While studying at university she competed in Under-23 international triathlons.

After graduating, Cleaver began her working career in corporate finance. She moved to Sydney to work in merchant banking and later joined Telstra's finance department, specialising in mergers and acquisitions. While on holiday in Hawaii she watched an Ironman event and decided to return to competitive triathlons.

In 2012 she was hit by a car and trailer in an accident while training in Boulder, Colorado but recovered and continued to compete. Since 2013 she has competed in Ironman Triathlons around the world; in her first Ironman, in Melbourne, she placed seventh, and in 2014 she placed fifth in the Canada Ironman Championships. In around 2013 she moved to Chattanooga, Tennessee to train and compete.

References

Living people
Year of birth missing (living people)
People from Auckland
New Zealand female triathletes